Bostanlı Open-air Archaeological Museum is an open-air archaeological museum in Karşıyaka district of İzmir, Turkey.

References

Archaeological museums in Turkey
İzmir
Karşıyaka District
Open-air museums in Turkey